Ashipa, the founder of the Lagos royal dynasty but uncrowned as Oba of Lagos, whom all Obas of Lagos trace their lineage to, was an Isheri Awori Chieftain. Ashipa was rewarded with title of Head War Chief/Oloriogun after returning the body of Asheru a benin War Captain to benin and received the Oba of Benin's sanction to govern Lagos. Some Benin accounts of history have the Ashipa as son or grandson of the Oba of Benin. According to the Lagos Traditional Account, Aṣípa or Ashípa (Yoruba: “The one who pave the path”) was an Awori Yoruba Chieftain of Isheri, Awori Land. 

Ashipa received a sword and royal drum as symbols of his authority from the Oba of Benin on his mission to Lagos. Additionally, the Oba of Benin deployed a group of Benin officers charged with preserving Benin's interests in Lagos. These officers, led by Eletu Odibo, were the initial members of the Akarigbere class of Lagos White Cap Chiefs.

References

People from Lagos
Obas of Lagos
History of Lagos
Yoruba monarchs
17th-century monarchs in Africa
17th-century Nigerian people
17th-century in Lagos
Residents of Lagos